Angstrem JSC is a Moscow-based company involved in the design and fabrication of electronic products and semiconductors. It produced a range of Soviet-era integrated circuits. After the fall of the Soviet Union, in 90s it has produced a line of calculators and bank cards.

History

Soviet Union 
Angstrem was founded on June 25, 1963, as NII-336 (Research Institute-336). It was later reorganized into the Research Institute of Fine Technology (NIITT) and Angstrem Factory as part of Scientific Production Association Science Center.

The company, along with Mikron (Moscow, Zelenograd) and Integral (Belarus, Minsk), was the main manufacturer of integrated circuits in the Soviet Union.

In 1981 Angstrem was awarded the Order of the October Revolution.

Russia
In 1993 NIITT and Angstrem Factory were privatized as a single company, Angstrem.

Sergei Veremeyenko acquired control of the three companies in 2004. In June 2008, these companies were transferred to a management company OOO Group Angstrem.

In 2008 Angstrem JSC partnered (formed a corporate group) with an Angstrem-T company and promised to pay its debt of a loan given by a Russian state bank VEB.RF if the latter fails to pay it.

In early 2009, 50 percent of the shares of Angstrem and JSC Angstrem-M owned JSC Coal Trade and JSC Finance Contract Group were controlled by Sergei Veremeyenko. 25 percent belonged, through the Ruselectronics holding company, to the State Corporation Rostec and the Russian Federation. 11 percent were owned by the concern Sitronics, and 14 percent by minority shareholders.

In August 2009, it was reported that Veremeyenko planned to transfer its stake in OAO Angstrem, JSC Angstrem-M, Renaissance Capital, Federal Property Management Agency and Management Angstrem in exchange for a promissory note debt, which is estimated at 200 million rubles.

In June 2012, JSC Russian Electronics increased its stake in OAO Angstrem up to 31 percent.

By 2014 it reportedly adopted an insulated-gate bipolar transistor technology.

In 2017 however the Angstrem-T was hit hard by Ukraine-related US sanctions and filled for bankruptcy. In 2018 the VEB.RF became a primary owner of the Angstrem-T and started to sell its equipment. It was reported that by the time of bankruptcy the Angstrem-T didn't reach 250 nm node process.

Angstrem-T 
In early 2007 it was widely speculated that AMD (now GlobalFoundries) was planning to sell its old 130 nm-process equipment from an unnamed plant located in Dresden, Germany to Angstrem-T, a company in Angstrem JSC corporate group, in order to speed up its upgrade to 300mm wafers.

In 2008 the Angstrem-T, entered a joint venture with the German company M+W Zander (Exyte) to build a semiconductor plant in Zelenograd, Russia. It was intended to produce ICs designed for the production of integrated circuits with topological node size of 130 nm (200mm wafers). Total investment in the construction of this plant amounted to about $100 million and additional ~$100–130 million was invested in the company later, with a significant share going for a clean room. 6000 square meters of production facilities were built. The fab was provided with a central heating, electricity generation, and cooling system running on natural gas.

In 2018 due to Ukraine-related US sanctions economically struggling and unable to pay its debt, Angstrem-T went bankrupt and was taken over by its primary creditor VEB.RF bank. In 2020 the latter sued Angstrem JSC for partial damages as it was in surety of the loan given earlier to Angstrem-T by VEB.RF (2008). At the time, the company was owned by Leonid Reiman, a Russian ex-minister. VEB.RF has acquired all Angstrem-T euipment via its subsidiary company called NM-Tech in mid 2021 that further has been contrated to produce banking cards for Mir (payment system).

According to one report the bankruptcy revealed that at the time the Angstrem-T was only able to reach 250 nm node process. It's also speculated that 3-year-long delivery delay of photolithography equipment (90-130 nm node) bought from AMD in 2009 has contributed to the company's insolvency.

On February 22, 2022, in response to the recognition of Ukrainian break-away regions in Donetsk and Luhansk by Vladimir Putin, president of Russia, the U.S. Department of the Treasury has imposed sanctions on JSC Angstrem-T company freezing its assets and prohibiting individuals and entities in the United States' jurisdiction from doing businesses with it.

Products 

 1013, 1801, 1806, and 1836 series of CPUs (PDP-11 instruction set)
 1830 series 8-bit microcontroller (MCS-51 instruction set)
 1839 series CPU (VAX instruction set)
 1867 series 16-bit DSP (Texas Instruments TMS320 instruction set)
 1871 series 4-bit microcontroller
 1874 series 16-bit microcontroller (Intel MCS-96 instruction set)
 1876 series CPU (MIPS32 instruction set)
 1878 and 5004 series 8-bit RISC microcontrollers
 1892VM11Ya CPU (MIPS32 instruction set; designed by ELVEES Multicore)
 5023 series radiation-hardened CPU (ARM instruction set)

See also

 7400 series – Second sources in Europe and the Eastern Bloc
 Soviet integrated circuit designation

References

External links 

 Official Site
 Page at the site of the holding "Russian Electronics"
 

Electronics companies of Russia
Computing in the Soviet Union
Electronics companies of the Soviet Union
Electronics companies established in 1963
Semiconductor companies of Russia
Ruselectronics
Russian brands
Zelenograd
Manufacturing companies based in Moscow
Ministry of the Electronics Industry (Soviet Union)
Research institutes in the Soviet Union